Vyacheslav Sobolev (born 13 October 1984) is a Kazakhstan former professional footballer who played as a right-back. He played for a number of clubs in Kazakhstan and made two appearances for the Kazakhstan national team.

References

1984 births
Living people
Kazakhstani footballers
Association football defenders
Kazakhstan international footballers
Kazakhstan under-21 international footballers
FC Vostok players
FC Atyrau players
FC Taraz players
FC Irtysh Pavlodar players
FC Kairat players
FC Zhenis Astana players
FC Caspiy players